British Bakeries is produces a variety of bakery products. British Bakeries parent company is Premier Foods.  British Bakeries had two factories in Bradford, one in Thornbury and one on Thornton Road, which closed recently as well as further factories in Kingston upon Hull, and Wigan.

Redundancy controversy 
The 2007 closure of British Bakeries factory on Thornton Road in Bradford was justified by the relatively small size of the factory, compared to its counterpart at the other side of town, as well as other factories, as well as the £6 million repair quote for the roof. 70 staff were made redundant, including many apprentices, who received completion of their training as part of their redundancy package. The move was highly criticised by Trade Unions. However, no industrial action was taken.

References 

Bakeries of the United Kingdom
Premier Foods